Kensington Gardens is a park in London, England.

Kensington Gardens may also refer to:

 Kensington Gardens (play),  a 1719 comedy play by the Irish actor John Leigh
 Kensington Gardens, South Australia, a suburb of Adelaide, South Australia
 Kensington Gardens Apartment Complex, an historic apartment complex in Buffalo, New York, United States

See also
 Kensington Garden, a 1722 poem by Thomas Tickell